Ohanna Shivanand/Shilpa Anand (born Shilpa Shivanand, 10 December 1982) is an Indian Model and Actress, who is known for her two different television roles as Dr. Riddhima Gupta and Dr. Shilpa Malhotra in Dill Mill Gayye. She has also starred in Indian films like Vishnu, also appeared in Music videos and television commercials. She was last seen in Bollywood film Yeh Hai Lollipop (2016).

Early life
Shivanand was born on 10 December 1982 in South Africa and did her schooling there. Her parents were from India, and later she moved there. In 2015, she changed her name to Ohanna Shivanand. In an Interview, she stated that:  She is the younger sister of Sakshi Shivanand, who is also an actress. Shivanand studied at Panjab University, obtaining a Masters in Computer Applications (MCA), from 2000 to 2003. She worked as a software developer for five years, with Java J2EE application development and E-Learning.

Career
Shivanand started her career as a model. She has done over 40 commercials, including for Coca-Cola with Aamir Khan, Lux soap with Aishwarya Rai Bachchan, and Dabur Pudin Hara and Nerolac Paint with Amitabh Bachchan. She has also worked as a model advertising a variety of brands.

Shivanand made her acting debut in South Indian film industry. Her first movie was Bezawada Police Station . In 2003, she starred in the telugu film Vishnu opposite Vishnu Manchu, produced by Mohan Babu. In 2006, she made her Bollywood debut with Ravi Shankar's film Iqraar by Chance, as Rashmi Mehra. 

Shivanand is also a television actress. She began her television career with the 2007 medical youth show Dill Mill Gayye, where she portrayed the role of Dr.Riddhima Gupta. It became no.1 show of Star One and she became an "instant success". In May 2008, she quit Dill Mill Gayye and her exit caused a sizeable drop in the ratings of the show. In 2019, during her Interview with "Spotboye", she revealed that she had quit in 2008 because she had a fight with the executive producer during shoot of "Zara Zara Touch Me Touch Me" dance sequence. In April 2009, when Sukirti Kandpal had quit, the producer Siddharth Malhotra approached Shivanand for returning to Dill Mill Gayye but she asked for high amount of money which caused a conflict between her and the producer. In June 2010, she finally returned on fans' demands and portrayed a different character, Dr. Shilpa Malhotra. In October 2010, Shivanand made an early exit from the show as per script, also because of internal differences among actors and low TRP.

In 2012, she was featured in BBC Production's telefilm Teri Meri Love Stories, where she portrayed the role of Meera. In 2015, she did a cameo role in channel BIG magic's show   Mahisagar.

In the media
An Indian lifestyle website for men, MensXP.com, listed Shivanand among the "35 Hottest Actresses In Indian Television" and also included her among the most desired actresses of Indian television among teens from 2000s.

Filmography

Films

Television

Music videos

Television advertisements
Appeared in Tv commercial "Nerolac Paints" with along with prominent Bollywood celebrity Amitabh Bachchan
Appeared in Tv commercial "Lux Soap" along with prominent Bollywood celebrity Aishwarya Rai Bachchan
Appeared in Tv commercial "Coca-Cola (Yaara Da Tashan)" along with prominent Bollywood celebrity with Aamir Khan
Appeared in Tv commercial "Fair & Lovely Soap"along with Malavika (actress) & Actor Aamir Ali
Appeared in Tv commercial "Mrs. Marino (hair softner)"
Appeared in Tv commercial "Sunsilk Shampoo"
Appeared in Tv commercial "Dabur Pudin Hara" along with prominent Bollywood celebrity Amitabh Bachchan
Appeared in Tv commercial "Pizza Hut" along with Bollywood celebrity Lillete Dubey
Appeared in Tv commercial "Moov cream"
Appeared in Tv commercial "Vasmol Kesh Kala"
Appeared in Tv commercial "New York Life Insurance"
Appeared in Tv commercial "Shanti Badaam Amla Hair Oil"
Appeared in Tv commercial "Nirma Washing Powder"
Appeared in Tv commercial "Chick Talcum Powder"
Appeared in Tv commercial "Kisna Diamond Jewellery"
Appeared in Tv commercial "Gold Bindya"
Appeared in Tv commercial "Kutchina Chimney"
Appeared in Tv commercial "Chandrika Soap"

Accolades

References

External links

 
 

Living people
1982 births
Indian film actresses
Indian television actresses
Indian soap opera actresses
Actresses in Hindi cinema
Actresses in Telugu cinema
Actresses in Kannada cinema
Actresses in Hindi television
Actresses from Karnataka
Female models from Karnataka
Indian expatriates in South Africa
21st-century Indian actresses